Feenagh is a village in west County Limerick, Ireland, ten miles from Newcastle West and six miles from Dromcolliher.

The village has one shop which is located on the site of the former Royal Irish Constabulary barracks near the old village pump. Feenagh also has a butcher shop.

The new national school was built in 1970 and has seven An Taisce green flags to its name. The Carnegie Library was built in 1917, and the old National School, built in 1847, is now used as a community centre.

The creamery built in the 1890s is now a garage. There are two holy wells in the locality of Feenagh. There was a new housing estate built on the site where the village forge once stood. The village originated as a settlement in Cloncrew. Feenagh/Kilmeedy became a parish in 1851. The population of the parish is about 900. The church in Feenagh was built in the 18th century and was rebuilt in the 1870s. The stained glass window at the altar of the church was donated  in memory of Hanora Irwin-Mc Mahon, by David Mc Mahon, native of Broadford.

People

 Nollaig Ó Gadhra, an Irish language activist, journalist and historian had served as the President of Conradh na Gaeilge from 2004 to 2005 and was also a founding member of  Teilifís na Gaeilge (TG4). Ó Gadhra was born on a family farm in Feenagh, County Limerick in 1943. His parents had returned to Ireland from the United States. He attended the Feenagh primary school before enrolling at the Scoil Mhuire secondary school in Dromcollogher and De La Salle residential school in Waterford. Ó Gadhra died on 13 August 2008, at the age of 64 at his home in Furbo, in Connemara.
 Rory Kiely (1934-2018), Fianna Fáil Senator 1977-2007, Cathaoirleach of Seanad Éireann 2002-2007, born on the family farm in Cloncrippa, Feenagh.

See also
 List of towns and villages in Ireland

External links
 Diocesan Heritage Project, Feenagh-Kilmeedy Parish

References

Towns and villages in County Limerick